Vitry-en-Artois (literally "Vitry in Artois";  or ) is a commune and in the Pas-de-Calais department in the Hauts-de-France region of France.

Geography
The river Scarpe flows through the town, which is also served by the SNCF railway. The World War II German airfield was later used by the Americans, then after the war, was put to commercial use as the local aerodrome.

History
The origin of the name comes from the Celtic, ‘’Vic’’ which means "castle" and ‘Ac’’ which means "at the water's edge". It appears later as "Victoriacum" mentioned in the 7th century. Middle stone age tools have been found in the area.

It was occupied by the Romans, until around the year 360 AD when Saint-Martin built a church here.

Aerial photography has revealed an isolated circular ditch monument at Vitry. The Merovingian villa of Vitry  was an important Neustrian seat, preferred to Arras. At Vitry, even as the nobles of Neustria were raising Sigibert I in triumph on his shield, he was murdered by hirelings of his brother Chilperic's third wife, Fredegunda, November–December 575. His son, the infant Clotaire II was taken to safety from the palace at Cambrai to Vitry to be raised in seclusion and security, according to Gregory of Tours.

In the Middle Ages, Vitry became a strategic place, because the river could be used to flood the defensive border of the city of Douai and ensure the functioning of its windmills.

During the Franco-Prussian war of 1870–1871, French General Faidherbe briefly established his headquarters in Vitry-en-Artois (from 25 to 31 December 1870) after the battle of Pont-Noyelles.

During the First World War, the population took refuge in the network of shelters and tunnels of the town. The destruction sustained on April 12, 1917 left the town completely destroyed, with 768 buildings gone and only 5 left standing.

On 23 September 1920, the town received the Croix de guerre.

Population

Places of interest
 The church of St.Martin, rebuilt, along with much of the village, after World War I.
 The war memorial.

See also
Communes of the Pas-de-Calais department

References

Vitryenartois